Soldam: Drop, Connect, Erase, or  in Japan, is a puzzle video game  developed by City Connection. It is the sequel of Jaleco's Soldam.

References

External links
  (Japanese)
  (English)

2017 video games
Nintendo Switch games
PlayStation 4 games
Puzzle video games
Video games developed in Japan
City Connection franchises
Multiplayer and single-player video games